The Mekong River with Sue Perkins is a television show on the BBC.

References

External links

2014 British television series debuts
2014 British television series endings
BBC high definition shows
BBC Television shows
British travel television series
Mekong River
English-language television shows
Television shows filmed in Vietnam
Television shows filmed in Laos
Television shows filmed in Cambodia
Television shows filmed in China